Volkovo is a rural locality (a village) in Podlesnoye Rural Settlement, Vologodsky District, Vologda Oblast, Russia. The population was 7 in 2002.

Geography 
Kharachevo, Burlevo, Babikovo, Mostishcha, Andreyevskoye, Yarilovo and Kozino are the nearest rural localities.

References 

Rural localities in Vologodsky District